Swix or SWIX may refer to:

 Swix (company), a Norwegian skiing goods and sports clothes company
 Star Wars: The Rise of Skywalker (SW:IX), a 2019 film which is the third and final installment of the sequel trilogy
 Swiks aka "Swix" (sank 1926), a three-masted schooner
 SWIX, the markup language, see  List of user interface markup languages
 Stonewall Industries (SWIX), see List of reporting marks: S

See also
 SW9 (disambiguation)